The Sedes Sapientiae (Latin for "Seat of Wisdom", one of the medieval titles of the Virgin), also known as Our Lady of Leuven, is a medieval wooden statue of the Virgin Mary. Nicolaas De Bruyne carved the statue in 1442, copying and enlarging an earlier and smaller statue from the 13th century. The polychromy was done by Roelof van Velpen. It has been restored several times: in 1842 by the Goyers workshop and in 1945 by Jos Van Uytvanck after it was damaged in the bombing of Leuven during World War II. It is located in St Peter's Church in the heart of the city of Leuven, Flanders. It is the symbol of the Catholic University of Leuven, and is depicted in the university's 1909 seal. It continues to serve as the seal of the University of Louvain (UCLouvain) and of the Katholieke Universiteit Leuven.

Veneration of the statue 
The veneration and popularity of the Sedes Sapientiae is evident, among other things, from the fact that the magistrate of Leuven regularly intervened in the costs of renewing the mantle made from gold leaf. People came from throughout Europe to venerate her. There are traditions that tell of high-ranking figures such as: Isabella of Portugal, wife of the Duke of Burgundy, Philip the Good, and Margaret of York coming to venerate the statue. During exam sessions, it is common for students from the university of Leuven to light candles and place them in front of the statue.

Damage and restoration 
The Sedes Sapientiae was severely damaged during the bombing of Leuven in 1944 during the Second World War. The collapse of the marble altar led to the statue falling down and fragmenting. Several large pieces of the Sedes Sapientiae were found amidst the rubble and were put back together again. Only three fingers from Baby Jesus and a small piece of the mantle had to be remade. The only change to the image was the removal of a hair curl on the child's temples and the replacement of the Gothic consoles on the pillars of the seat with spherical ends.

References

Early Netherlandish sculpture
Gothic sculptures
Statues of the Madonna and Child
1442 sculptures
Wooden sculptures in Belgium
 Christian art
 Catholic art
Catholic sculpture